Joshua Gabriel Baker (March 23, 1799 – April 16, 1885) was the 22nd Governor of Louisiana during Reconstruction.

Early life
Joshua was born March 23, 1799  in Mason County, Kentucky. His father was Joshua Baker and his mother was Susan Lewis. In 1803, the Baker family moved to the Mississippi Territory and by 1811 they had settled at Oaklawn Plantation in St. Mary Parish, Louisiana, in the Territory of Orleans

Baker attended the United States Military Academy at West Point, New York from 1817 to 1819. Whereupon, he was commissioned a Second Lieutenant in the Army Artillery Corps and served as an assistant professor at West Point before resigning in October 1820. In 1821, he moved to Litchfield, Connecticut, to study law, joining the bar in Mason County, Kentucky, in 1822.

Career
Baker returned to Louisiana to practice law at the Opelousas, Louisiana, office of John Brownson during 1822–1829 and 1832–1838.

From 1826 to 1829, Baker was a Colonel in the Louisiana State Militia. He also worked on Engineering projects in Plaquemines Parish until 1829, when he was appointed Judge in St. Mary Parish; a position he held until 1839.

In 1833, he was Assistant State Engineer for the State of Louisiana until 1838. He was appointed Director of Public Works for the State of Louisiana 1840–1845.

He was made Captain of Cavalry, Louisiana State Militia 1846 until 1851 and in 1853, he was appointed to the Board of Visitors United States Military Academy, serving until 1861. Throughout this time, Baker owned three plantations: Black Bayou in Terrebonne Parish, Grand River in St. Martin Parish, and Fairfax Plantation in St. Mary Parish. He also was enthusiastic investor in steamboat properties.

Civil War and Governorship
With secession and the Civil War, Colonel Baker retired to Franklin, Louisiana, in 1861. As a Conservative Democrat who opposed secession, he chose to cooperate with the Union Army of Occupation. On January 8, 1868, Baker took the Oath of Loyalty to the Union. He was Appointed Military Governor by General Winfield Scott Hancock upon the resignation of Benjamin Flanders. As Governor, Baker supported the lenient reconstruction plan of President Andrew Johnson. His administration had little influence on the course of the Louisiana government, as its orders were liable to be countermanded by the military due to the reconstruction acts. Baker removed 9 New Orleans City Councilmen which resulted in President Ulysses S. Grant's reversal of this order. For this, Governor Baker resigned and in a special election Republican Henry C. Warmoth was elected Governor.

Personal life
In 1825, Baker married Fanny Assheton Stelle in Opelousas. Before her death on August 17, 1831, they were the parents of three children, including:

 Margaret Baker (1828–1893), who married John Peck Van Bergen, a brother of Anthony T. Van Bergen, a son of New York Assemblyman Anthony Van Bergen, and grandson of New York State Senator Peter A. Van Bergen.

He married a second time to Catherine Patton from Fairfax, Virginia in 1832. They had two children.

Baker died in Lyme, Connecticut on April 16, 1885 at "Cricket Lawn" the home of his daughter Margaret Van Bergen. He was interred at Green-Wood Cemetery in Brooklyn, New York.

References

External links

Democratic Party governors of Louisiana
1799 births
1885 deaths
Burials at Green-Wood Cemetery
People from Mason County, Kentucky
Louisiana Unionists
Unionist Party state governors of the United States
People from Franklin, Louisiana
Litchfield Law School alumni